Porta Metronia is a gate in the third-century Aurelian Walls of Rome, Italy. The gate is located in the southern section of the wall between Porta San Giovanni to the east and Porta Latina to the south.

During the tenth century, beyond this gate was marshland called the Prata Decii or the Decenniae. At the end of the Middle Ages, the gate was closed and the entrance bricked up.

Because of increasing traffic in the modern era, four main passages were created beside the original gate. The ground level around the gate has risen significantly through the ages, leaving the original passage partially underground.

See also

List of ancient monuments in Rome

Notes

References

External links
Roma Segreta: Porta Metronia in Italiano
RomeArtLover Short article on the Porta Metronia

Metronia
Rome R. XIX Celio
Rome Q. IX Appio-Latino